Gramaphone Records is a DJ-based vinyl record store in Chicago, Illinois.

History
The store opened in 1969 and originally sold folk, jazz, and blues music. By the 1980s, the store was selling house music records. The store was the first of its kind in the Chicago area, focusing on vinyl for DJs, and since has become a destination point for traveling DJs. The store focuses on stocking house, techno and electronic music and has been important in the promotion of Chicago house music. It is currently owned by DJ Michael Serafini.

In film
The store has been featured in the documentary Better Living Through Circuitry.

External links
Gramaphone Records Website

References

Companies based in Chicago
Music retailers of the United States